Suoh or Suwoh is an 8 × 16 km wide volcano-tectonic depression in the southern part of Sumatra, Indonesia. Historical maars and silicic lava domes are found along the Great Sumatran fault line. Phreatic eruptions occurred during the major 1933 Liwa earthquake, West Lampung Regency, Lampung Province

See also 

 List of volcanoes in Indonesia

References 

Volcanoes of Sumatra
Maars of Indonesia
Calderas of Indonesia
VEI-4 volcanoes